The Independent Schools Association (ISA) is an organisation for private schools in the United Kingdom. Founded in 1878, it is one of the country's oldest such groups. It is a constituent association of the Independent Schools Council, and has a membership of Headteachers who represent over 600 schools. The Association's headquarters are in Great Chesterford, Essex.

The organisation offers professional support and training for Headteachers and staff of its Members' schools, as well as sports and arts activities for pupils.

Arts activities include an annual national art competition, a drama festival, essay writing competitions and much more. A variety of sports are also celebrated, from cross country running, team sports such as football, netball and rugby, as well as table tennis, hockey and much more.

Sport and Arts events arranged by the ISA are held on both the local and national stage.

Members of ISA represent a diverse range of schools within the independent sector. These include pre-prep and preparatory schools, junior schools, senior schools and sixth form colleges. Boarding schools are also represented across the Association's membership, as well as schools for children with special educational needs, and some schools that specialise in the Arts.

References

External links
 Official website

Education in Essex
 
Educational institutions established in 1879
Organisations based in Essex
Private school organisations in England
1879 establishments in the United Kingdom
1879 in education
Teacher associations based in the United Kingdom